Queen Wonjeong of the Seonsan Gim clan (d. 23 April 1018) was a Goryeo princess as the older daughter and child of King Seongjong, from Queen Munhwa who became a queen consort through her marriage with her half first cousin once removed, King Hyeonjong as his first and primary wife. From this marriage, Queen Wonjeong became the seventh reigned Goryeo queen who followed her maternal clan after Queen Seonjeong, her stepsister and predecessor.

In 1009, after Gang Jo (강조) led a coup to dethroned King Mokjong and appointed Wang Sun as the new king, she then was chosen to be his first wife and Queen consort. During her lifetime, she was called as Princess Yeonheung (연흥궁주, 延興宮主) and Queen Hyeondeok (현덕왕후, 玄德王后) while lived in the "Hyeondeok Palace" (현덕궁, 玄德宮). A year later, when the Khitans invaded, the king moved to the south and she then follow him as well to Naju. After it was retreated, they then returned to the royal palace.

Meanwhile, on 23 April 1018, she died at her own residence ("Hyeondeok Palace") and was buried in "Hwareung Tomb" (화릉, 和陵). She then received her Posthumous name of Won-jeong (원정, 元貞) and Ui-hye (의혜, 懿惠) in 1027 (18th year reing of her husband).

In popular culture
Portrayed by Park Si-eun and Lee Ra-hye in the 2009 KBS2 TV series Empress Cheonchu.

References

External links 
Queen Wonjeong on Encykorea .
Queen Wonjeong on Digital Gumi Cultural Exhibition .
원정왕후 on Doosan Encyclopedia .

10th-century births
Year of birth unknown
1018 deaths
Consorts of Hyeonjong of Goryeo
Goryeo princesses
Korean queens consort
11th-century Korean women